Roberts is a surname of British origin. This list provides links to biographies of people who share this surname.

A
Abraham Roberts, British general, father of Earl Roberts
Ada Palmer Roberts, American poet
Adam Roberts (disambiguation), several people
Alasdair Roberts (musician), Scottish folk musician
Alasdair Roberts (academic), law professor and author
Albert H. Roberts, American politician
Alby Roberts, New Zealand cricketer
Alf Roberts, fictional character from Coronation Street
Alf Roberts (trade unionist) (1910–1971), British engineering industry trade unionist
Alfred Roberts (trade unionist) (1897–1963), British cotton industry trade unionist
Alfred Jabez Roberts (1863–1939), South Australian stockbroker and sportsman
Alfred "Uganda" Roberts (1943–2020), American percussionist
Alfred Roberts, politician and father of Margaret Thatcher
Alice Roberts, English anatomist, osteoarchaeologist and presenter
Allene Roberts, American actress
Alphonso Theodore Roberts, cricketer and activist from Trinidad and Tobago
Alton Wayne Roberts, Ku Klux Klan member
Amabel Scharff Roberts (1891–1918), American nurse
Amos Roberts, Australian rugby league player
Andrew Roberts (historian), English historian
Andy Roberts (cricketer), Antiguan cricketer
Andy Roberts (musician), English musician
Anita Roberts, American molecular biologist
Anne Roberts, Canadian politician
Anthony Ellmaker Roberts, American politician
Ashley Roberts, American burlesque dancer
Arthur Roberts (comedian), English music hall entertainer
Arthur Roberts (film editor), American film editor 
Arthur Roberts (physicist), American physicist and composer
Arthur Spencer Roberts, English painter
Audrey Roberts, fictional character from Coronation Street TV series
Austin Roberts (zoologist), South African zoologist
Austin Roberts (American football), American football player

B
Barbara Roberts, American politician
Barbara Millicent Roberts, fictional name of doll Barbie
Bartholomew Roberts, Welsh pirate Black Bart
Ben Roberts (poker player), British poker player
Ben Roberts (actor), television actor
Benjamin Titus Roberts, American Methodist minister
Bernadette Roberts, Catholic contemplative
Bernard Roberts, English pianist
Betty Roberts, American politician
Bill Roberts (athlete), British sprinter
Billy Roberts, American songwriter (Hey Joe)
Bip Roberts, American baseball player
Bob Roberts, American recording artist
Brad Roberts, Canadian musician
Brian Roberts (disambiguation), several people, including:
Brian Roberts (baseball), American baseball player
Brian L. Roberts, American CEO
Brigham Henry Roberts, American Latter Day Saints leader and historian
Buddy Roberts, American wrestler
Byron Roberts (producer), American motion picture producer
Byron Roberts, English heavy metal musician

C
C. R. Roberts (born 1936), American football player
Cecil Roberts (disambiguation), several people including
Cecil Roberts (1892–1976), English novelist
Cecil Roberts (labor unionist) (born 1946), president of the United Mine Workers of America
Cecil Roberts (politician) (1877–1961), Australian politician
Charles Roberts (disambiguation), several people including
Charles Boyle Roberts (1842–1899), U.S. Congressman from Maryland.
Charles Carl Roberts IV, American milk truck driver who murdered five girls before killing himself in an Amish school in Nickel Mines, Pennsylvania
Charles S. Roberts (1930–2010), American boardgame creator, founder of Avalon Hill
Charles Roberts (Canadian football) (born 1979), Canadian football player
Charles G. D. Roberts (1860–1943), Canadian poet and author
Charlie Roberts (1883–1939), English footballer
Charlotte Roberts (born 1957), British bioarchaeologist and palaeopathologist
Chris Roberts (disambiguation), several people including
Chris Roberts (skateboarder), American skateboarder, action sports movie star, radio and television personality, founder of The Nine Club.
Chris Roberts (baseball) (born 1971), American baseball player and coach
Chris Roberts (chairman), ex-chairman of Torquay United Football Club
Chris Roberts (video game developer) (born 1968), American video game designer, programmer, film producer, and director
Chris Roberts (pilot) (born 1945), British former test pilot, and Red Arrows pilot
Chris Roberts (singer) (1944–2017), German singer and actor
Chris Ioan Roberts (born 1985), Australian actor
Christian Roberts (born 1979), Welsh footballer
Christian Roberts (actor) (1944–2022), English actor
Christopher Trevor-Roberts (died 2005), British teacher
Clarence J. Roberts (1873–1931), Justice of the New Mexico Supreme Court
Clifford Roberts (1894–1977), Augusta National chairman
Clint Roberts (disambiguation), several people including
Clint Roberts (politician) (1935–2017), South Dakota politician
Clint Roberts (broadcaster) (born 1987), New Zealand radio host
Cokie Roberts (1943–2019), American broadcast journalist
Connor Roberts (disambiguation), several people including
Connor Roberts (footballer, born 1995), Welsh footballer
Connor Roberts (footballer, born 1992), Welsh footballer
Cord Roberts, fictional character from the soap opera One Life to Live
Craig Roberts (disambiguation), several people including
Craig Roberts (born 1991), Welsh actor and director
Craig Roberts (wrestler) (1968–2006), Canadian wrestler
Craig G. Roberts (1930–2009), American horse trainer
Curt Roberts (1929–1969), Major League baseball second baseman

D
Dale Roberts (disambiguation), multiple people
Dan Roberts (disambiguation), multiple people
Daniel Roberts (disambiguation), multiple people
Danny Roberts (Australian actor)
Danny Roberts (The Real World), American best known for appearing on The Real World: New Orleans
Darrell Roberts, American guitarist
Dave Roberts (outfielder), American baseball outfielder
Dave Roberts (pitcher), American major league baseball pitcher
David Roberts (disambiguation), several people including
David Roberts (mayor), the 36th mayor of Hoboken, New Jersey
David Roberts (painter), Scottish painter
David Roberts (swimmer), Welsh swimmer
David Thomas Roberts, American ragtime composer
Dean Roberts (musician), New Zealand musician
Deborah Roberts, American broadcaster
Desmond Roberts English actor
Dick Roberts (disambiguation), several people
Doris Roberts, American actress
Douglas Roberts, Australian painter and art critic
Douglas B. Roberts, American politician
Dread Pirate Roberts, fictional character from The Princess Bride
Denys Tudor Emil Roberts, British administrator in Hong Kong

E
Ed Roberts (disambiguation), several people including:
Ed Roberts (activist), in disability rights
Ed Roberts (computer engineer), American engineer & entrepreneur
Edward Glenn Roberts, Jr., race driver Fireball Roberts
Edward B. Roberts, American technology writer, academic and investor
Edward D. Roberts, American politician
Edward Roberts (Canadian politician), Canadian politician
Eigra Lewis Roberts (born 1939), Welsh author
Eirlys Roberts, British consumer advocate and campaigner
Eleazar Roberts, Welsh musician and translator
Eliza Roberts, British nurse of the Crimean War
Elizabeth Madox Roberts, Kentucky-born author
Emma Roberts, American actress
Lady Gerald Fitzalan-Howard, born Emma Roberts, British aristocrat
Eric Roberts, American actor, brother of Julia Roberts
Ethan Roberts, American baseball player
Eugene Roberts (neuroscientist) (1920–2016), American neuroscientist
Evan Roberts (disambiguation), several people including
Evan Roberts (radio personality), American radio personality
Evan Roberts (minister) (fl. 1900s), British (Wales)

F
Floyd Roberts, American racing driver
Frank Crowther Roberts, British general
Frederick Roberts, 1st Earl Roberts, British field marshal
Frederick Roberts (British Army officer), British Army officer, son of Earl Roberts
Frederick Madison Roberts, American politician
 Frederick Roberts (politician), British Labour Party Member of Parliament 1918–1931 and 1935–1941
 Fred Roberts, American basketball player 
 Fred Roberts (American football coach), coach of the Oklahoma Sooners in 1901
 Fred Roberts (Royal Air Force officer), Welsh RAF officer and cricketer
 Fred Roberts (footballer, born 1905), Irish footballer
 Fred Roberts (footballer, born 1909), English football forward, played for Birmingham and Luton Town in the 1930s
 Fred Roberts (rugby union), New Zealand rugby union footballer who played for The Original All Blacks
 Frederick G. Roberts, English cricketer for Gloucestershire
 Frederick Roberts (Somerset cricketer), English cricketer for Somerset
 Frederick Roberts (cricketer, born 1848), English cricketer for Surrey
 Fred S. Roberts, professor of mathematics at Rutgers University

G
Gareth Roberts (writer), British television writer
Gareth Roberts (footballer), Welsh (soccer) footballer
Gary Roberts (ice hockey), Canadian ice hockey player
Garry Roberts (1950–2022), Irish rock guitarist, formerly with the Boomtown Rats
Gene Roberts (disambiguation), several people including
Gene Roberts, name used by actress Meg Randall, before 1949
Gene Roberts (American football), NFL football player
George Roberts (disambiguation), several people including
George Roberts (trombonist), American musician
George Henry Roberts, British Labour MP, Minister of Labour
George Philip Bradley Roberts, British World War II general
George R. Roberts, American financier
George W. Roberts, American soldier
Gilroy Roberts, engraver for the United States Mint
Gordon Ray Roberts, American soldier
Graham Roberts, English footballer
Grant Roberts, American baseball player
Greg Roberts (Designer), American Game Designer
Gregory David Roberts, Australian criminal and writer
Gwilym Roberts, British politician

H
Hank Roberts, jazz cellist
Harry Roberts (disambiguation), several people including
Harry Roberts (inventor), Swedish inventor
Harry Roberts (murderer), British murderer
Herbie Roberts, English (soccer) footballer
Holly Roberts, American artist
Howard Roberts, American jazz guitarist
Howard Roberts (sculptor), American sculptor
Howard Radclyffe Roberts, American entomologist and museum administrator
Hugh Roberts (disambiguation), several people
Hannah Roberts (disambiguation), several people
Haydon Roberts, English footballer
Hubert Roberts (born 1961), American-Israeli basketball player

I
Ian Roberts (painter), Iain Roberts, Australian painter
Iain Roberts, New Zealand skeleton racer
Ian Roberts (disambiguation), several people
Isaac Roberts, British astronomer
Issachar Jacox Roberts, American Baptist missionary
Ivor Roberts (actor), English actor and television presenter
Ivor Roberts (ambassador), British ambassador to Italy
Iwan Roberts, Welsh international footballer

J
J. O. M. Roberts (1916–1997), Himalayan mountaineer-explorer
Jake Roberts (born 1955), Jake "The Snake" Roberts, American professional wrestler
James J. Roberts (born 1947), newsman and poet
James Reynolds Roberts (1826–1859), British soldier
Jamie Roberts (born 1986), Welsh Rugby player
Jane Roberts (disambiguation), several people including
Jane Roberts (1929–1984), American psychic
Jane Roberts (first lady) (c. 1819–1914), First Lady of Liberia
Jane Roberts, Lady Roberts (1949–2021), British Royal librarian
Jason Roberts (disambiguation), several people including
Jason Roberts (author), American author
Jason Roberts (footballer) (born 1978), Grenadian football player
Jason Roberts (weightlifter), Australian weightlifter
Jeremy Dale Roberts (1934–2017), English composer
Jeron Roberts (born 1976), American-Israeli basketball player
Jimmy Roberts (disambiguation), several people including
Jimmy Roberts, NBC sports broadcaster
Jimmy Roberts (singer), featured performer on the Lawrence Welk Show
Jimmy T. Roberts, cult leader
Joan Roberts, American actress
John Roberts (disambiguation), several people including
John Herbert Roberts, 1st Baron Clwyd (1863–1955), Welsh Liberal politician
John Trevor Roberts, 2nd Baron Clwyd (1900–1987), Welsh politician
John G. Roberts Jr (born 1955), 17th Chief Justice of the United States
John Roberts (television reporter), aka  "J.D. Roberts", television journalist with CBS News, CTV, CNN
John Roberts (Canadian politician), member of the Parliament of Canada
John Roberts (historian), Oxford historian and author
John Roberts (Speed Channel host), television host on the Speed Channel
John Roberts (businessman), John C. Roberts, founder of Multiplex, an Australian construction firm
John Roberts (martyr), Saint John Roberts, one of the Catholic Forty Martyrs of England and Wales
John Roberts (urban planner), founder of TEST Transport & Environment Studies consultancy
John Maddox Roberts, American science fiction writer
John Milton Roberts, anthropologist
John Q. Roberts, United States Navy officer, pilot, and Navy Cross recipient
John Roberts (mayor), New Zealand businessman and politician
Jonathan Roberts (politician), American farmer, U.S. Senator for Pennsylvania
Jonathan Roberts (writer), (fl. 1990s), American author, screenwriter, and TV producer
Jonathan M. Roberts, writer
Joseph Jenkins Roberts, first President of Liberia
Julia Roberts, American actress
Julia Roberts (QVC presenter)
Julian Roberts, English librarian and bibliographer
Julian Roberts (businessman), Chief Executive of Old Mutual plc
Julie Roberts, American country singer
Julie Roberts (artist), Welsh painter
Juliet Roberts, British singer
Justine Roberts, British cofounder of Mumsnet

K
Kane Roberts, American guitarist
Kate Roberts (author), Welsh novelist
Katherine Roberts, English writer
Katherine Roberts (TV personality)
Kathryn Roberts, English folk musician
Keith Roberts, British science fiction writer
Kelso Roberts, Canadian politician
Ken Roberts (disambiguation), several people including:
Ken Roberts (announcer), American radio and television announcer
Ken Roberts (author), Canadian children's writer
Ken Roberts (footballer, born 1936), English football coach
Kennedy Roberts Grenadian Entrepreneur
Kenneth Roberts (author), American historical novelist
Kenny Roberts, American motorcycle racer
Kevin Roberts (disambiguation)

L
Lawrence Roberts (disambiguation), several people including
Lawrence Roberts (basketball), American basketball player
Lawrence Roberts (scientist), Larry Roberts, American Internet developer
Lemuel Roberts, American Revolutionary War soldier and author
Leon Roberts, American baseball player
Leona Vidal Roberts, Falkland Islands politician.
Leonard Roberts, American actor
Les Roberts (disambiguation), several people including
Les Roberts (mystery novel writer), American mystery novel writer
Les Roberts (epidemiologist), American epidemiologist
Leslie Roberts Canadian television journalist
Lewis Roberts-Thomson, Australian rules footballer
Lincoln Roberts, cricketer from Trinidad and Tobago
Lisa Roberts (disambiguation), several people
Loren Roberts, American golfer
Luckey Roberts, (1887–1968), American musician
Luke Roberts, Australian cyclist
Lynette Roberts, British poet
Lynn Roberts, American big band singer
Lynne Roberts, American actress
Lynne Roberts (basketball), American basketball coach

M
Marcus Roberts, American jazz pianist
Margaret Roberts, maiden name of British Prime Minister Margaret Thatcher
Marietta Roberts, Canadian politician
Mark Roberts (disambiguation), several people including:
Mark Roberts (streaker), English streaker
Mark Roberts (singer), British singer and guitarist
Mark Roberts (Australian footballer), Australian Football League player
Mary Roberts (disambiguation), several people including
Mary Roberts (bodybuilder), professional female bodybuilder
Mary Fanton Roberts, American journalist
Matana Roberts, American jazz saxophonist
Matt Roberts, British sports presenter
Matty Roberts (disambiguation), several people
Michael Roberts (disambiguation), several people including:
Michael Roberts (writer), English poet, writer, critic and broadcaster
Michael Roberts (historian), English historian
Michael Roberts (footballer), Australian rules footballer
Michael Roberts (American football), American football player
Michelle Roberts, Australian politician
Mike Roberts (sports broadcaster), American sports broadcaster
Monty Roberts, horse trainer
Morganna Roberts, American baseball personality Morganna

N
Nash Roberts, American meteorologist
Neil Roberts (disambiguation), several people including
Neil Roberts (Australian footballer), Australian rules footballer
Dr. Neil Roberts, fictional character from The O. C.
Nesta Roberts, Welsh journalist
Nia Roberts (disambiguation), two people:
Nia Roberts (actress) (born 1972), Welsh actress
Nia Roberts (presenter), Welsh radio and television presenter
Nicola Roberts, English pop singer, member of Girls Aloud
Nicole Roberts, American women's soccer player
Nickla Roberts, American wrestling valet
 Nina Roberts, stage name of a French pornographic actress
Niniwa Roberts, New Zealand field hockey player
Nora Roberts, American romantic novelist

O
Ollie P. Roberts, who claimed to be Billy the Kid
Oral Roberts, American evangelist
Oran M. Roberts, (1879–1883), governor of Texas
Owen Josephus Roberts, Associate Justice of the United States Supreme Court

P
Paddy Roberts (disambiguation), several people
Pat Roberts, American politician
Patricia Roberts Harris, American politician                  
Patrice Roberts, Female soca singer of Trinidad and Tobago
Paul Craig Roberts, American journalist
Paul William Roberts, Canadian writer
Pennant Roberts, British television director and producer
Pernell Roberts, American actor
Peter Scawen Watkinson Roberts, British Army officer
Phillip Waipuldanya Roberts, Australian Aboriginal doctor
Phyllis Roberts, British artist

R
Rachel Roberts (disambiguation), several people including
Rachel Roberts (actress)
Rachel Roberts (model)
Ralph Roberts (disambiguation), several people including
Ralph J. Roberts, co-founder of Comcast Communications
Ralph J. Roberts (geologist), American geologist
Ralph Roberts (automotive designer) a car designer who worked for the Chrysler Corporation
Ralph R. Roberts (politician), 20th century US politician
Rhydian Roberts, Welsh singer
Richard Roberts (disambiguation), several people including:
Richard Roberts (engineer), British engineer
Richard J. Roberts, British biochemist
Richard Roberts (evangelist), American
Rick Roberts (disambiguation), several people including
Rick Roberts (hockey player), Canadian field hockey player
Rick Roberts (actor), Canadian actor
Rick Roberts (musician), American rock musician
Robert Roberts (disambiguation), several people including:
Robert Richford Roberts, American Methodist bishop
Robin Roberts (disambiguation), several people including
Robin Roberts (baseball), baseball player
Robin Roberts (sportscaster), ABC Good Morning America anchor and former ESPN anchor
Rod Roberts, Director of the Iowa Department of Inspection and Appeals and former state legislator
Rev. Lord Roger Roberts, Baron Roberts of Llandudno, British Liberal Democrat Peer
Roger Roberts, Baron Roberts of Llandudno, British politician
Rollan Roberts, American politician
Roy Roberts (disambiguation), several people including
Roy Roberts, American character actor
Roy 'Hog' Roberts, controversial inmate executed in Missouri
Roy Roberts (blues artist), North Carolina blues artist
Russell Roberts, Russ Abbot, British comedian
Ryan Roberts (baseball), Major League Baseball infielder

S
Sailor Roberts, American poker player
Sam Roberts (singer-songwriter), Canadian rock musician
Samuel Roberts (disambiguation), multiple people
Sandy Roberts, Australian sports broadcaster
Sara Weeks Roberts, American social reformer and activist
Sebastian Roberts, British Army general and educator
Sheldon Roberts, American semiconductor pioneer
Shevyn Roberts, American pop singer
Siobhan Roberts, Canadian science journalist
Stan Roberts, Canadian politician
Stephen Roberts (disambiguation), several people
Steven Roberts (disambiguation), several people
Stuart Roberts (disambiguation), several people

T
Tanya Roberts, American actress
Tecumsay Roberts, Liberian musician
Terrell Roberts, American football player
Terrence Roberts, one of the Little Rock Nine
Terry Roberts, Australian politician
Thomas Roberts (disambiguation), several people including:
Thomas Roberts (footballer), English footballer who played for Bristol Rovers
Thomas Roberts (news anchor), American news anchor
Thomas J. "Long Tom" Roberts, fictional character, companion of Doc Savage
Tiffany Roberts-Lovell, American politician
Tom Roberts (disambiguation), several people
Tommy Roberts (disambiguation), several people
Tony Roberts (actor)
Tony Roberts (footballer), Welsh (soccer) footballer
Tracey Roberts (disambiguation), two people:
Tracey Roberts (actress), American film and TV supporting performer
Tracey Roberts (politician), Western Australian City of Wanneroo mayor
Troy Roberts (disambiguation), multiple people
Tyson R. Roberts, American ichthyologist

V
Veronica Roberts, British actress
Virgil Roberts, American politician

W
Wayne Roberts (disambiguation)
Wilfrid Roberts, British politician
Will Roberts, Welsh painter
William Roberts (disambiguation), several people including:
William Roberts (painter), vorticist painter of the early 20th century
William Roberts (physician), the first to discover, in 1874 that certain molds prevented bacterial growth
William Roberts (screenwriter)
William Roberts (veteran), British veteran of the First World War
William Roberts (Alberta politician), Alberta (Canada) Politician, NDP MLA
William R. Roberts, American politician
Rick Ross, American rapper, born William Leonard Roberts II
Winifred Roberts, former name of British painter Winifred Nicholson

X
Xavier Roberts, American creator of Cabbage Patch Dolls

Y
Yvonne Roberts, English journalist

Z
Zizi Roberts, Liberian (soccer) football player

See also
Lord Roberts
Baron Robartes (Roberts), (first creation) and Earl of Radnor (Robartes/Roberts family), English peerages created 1679
Baron Robartes (Roberts), (second creation) and Viscount Clifden (Agar-Robartes family), English peerage created 1869
Earl Roberts, United Kingdom peerage created in 1901
Baron Clwyd (Roberts family), United Kingdom peerage created in 1919
Wyn Roberts, Baron Roberts of Conwy (1930–2013), Welsh Conservative peer
Roger Roberts, Baron Roberts of Llandudno (born 1935), Welsh Liberal Democrat peer
Goronwy Roberts, Baron Goronwy-Roberts (1913–1981), Welsh Labour MP and peer
Roberts family (Liberia)

Lists of people by surname